Althea Gilharry (born 12 January 1970) is a Belizean athlete. She competed in the women's triple jump at the 1996 Summer Olympics.

References

1970 births
Living people
Athletes (track and field) at the 1996 Summer Olympics
Belizean female triple jumpers
Olympic athletes of Belize
Place of birth missing (living people)